David Oliver Sacks (born 25 May 1972) is an entrepreneur, author, and investor in internet technology firms. He is general partner of Craft Ventures, a venture capital fund he co-founded in late 2017. Previously, Sacks was the founding COO and product leader of PayPal and founder/CEO of Yammer. In 2016, he became interim CEO of Zenefits for 10 months. In 2017, Sacks co-founded Craft Ventures, an early-stage venture fund. His angel investments include Facebook, Uber, SpaceX, Palantir Technologies and Airbnb. He is a co-host of the podcast All In.

Early life and education
Sacks was born in Cape Town, South Africa, and immigrated to Tennessee, United States, with his family when he was five. Though Sacks did not know he wanted to be an entrepreneur, he did not want to work a profession like his father, who was an endocrinologist. He took inspiration from his grandfather, who started a candy factory in the 1920s.

Sacks attended Memphis University School in Memphis, Tennessee. He earned his B.A. in economics from Stanford University in 1994 and received a J.D. from the University of Chicago Law School in 1998.

Career

PayPal
In 1999, Sacks left his job as a management consultant for McKinsey & Company to join e-commerce service PayPal, which had been co-founded the year before by Max Levchin and Peter Thiel. As PayPal's COO and product leader, he built many of the company's key teams, and was responsible for product management and design, sales and marketing, business development, international, customer service, fraud operations, and human resources functions.
 
During his tenure, PayPal grew payment volume from zero to $3.5 billion per year and revenue from zero to over $100 million in 2001. The company introduced business accounts, and expanded into multiple currencies and over 80 countries.

PayPal had their initial public offering in February 2002. It was one of the first IPOs after the September 11 attacks. The stock rose more than 54% on the first day. In October 2002, eBay acquired PayPal for $1.5 billion.

Sacks is a member of the so-called "PayPal Mafia", a group of founders and early employees of PayPal who went on to found a series of other successful technology companies. They are often credited with inspiring Web 2.0 and for the re-emergence of consumer-focused Internet companies after the dot com bust of 2001.

Thank You for Smoking
Following PayPal's acquisition, Sacks produced and financed the movie Thank You for Smoking through his independent production company, Room 9 Entertainment.

Based on Christopher Buckley's 1994 novel of the same title and adapted for the screen by director Jason Reitman, Thank You for Smoking is a satirical look at the culture of spin. The cast included Aaron Eckhart, William H. Macy, Sam Elliott, Rob Lowe, Maria Bello, Katie Holmes, Adam Brody, and Robert Duvall.

Thank You for Smoking was nominated for two Golden Globes in 2007 for Best Picture and Best Actor in the Comedy/Musical category. The movie also won Best Screenplay at the Independent Spirit Awards, Audience Awards at both the Munich and Norwegian Film Festivals, Best First Feature at the Toronto Film Critics Association Awards, Best Adapted Screenplay at the Washington D.C. Area Film Critics Association Awards and the San Diego Film Critics Association Awards, and Top Films of the Year at the New York Film Critics Online.

Geni.com
In 2006, Sacks founded Geni.com, a genealogy website that enables family members to collaboratively build an online family tree. At Geni, he wanted more visibility into what was going on across the organization, so the team created a productivity tool to help employees share information. In 2008, Sacks and co-founder Adam Pisoni spun this internal communications tool into a standalone company called Yammer. Geni was acquired by MyHeritage in 2012.

Yammer
In 2008, Yammer launched the first Enterprise Social Network, a secure solution for internal corporate communication and collaboration, winning the grand prize at TechCrunch50 conference. According to Social Capital, Yammer's viral approach made it among the fastest-growing Software-as-a-Service (SaaS) companies in history, exceeding eight million enterprise users in just four years. Yammer received approximately US$142 million in funding from venture capital firms such as Charles River Ventures, Founders Fund, Emergence Capital Partners, and Goldcrest Investments.

In July 2012, Microsoft acquired Yammer for $1.2 billion as a core part of its cloud/social strategy.

Zenefits
In December 2014, Sacks made a "major investment" in Zenefits. In January 2016, Zenefits' board asked him to step in as interim CEO amidst a "regulatory crisis" regarding the company's licensing compliance. Over the next year, Sacks negotiated a resolution with insurance regulators across the U.S. – receiving praise for "righting the ship". Sacks also revamped Zenefits' product line with an initiative he named "Z2", introducing a SaaS business model. Shortly after, PC Magazine would note Zenefits had become "the best HR software on the market" while Buzzfeed reported the company was losing over $200 million per year. After just 10 months in the role, Sacks was succeeded by former Ooyala CEO, Jay Fulcher.

Angel investments
Sacks has been investing in technology companies for twenty years. As an angel investor, his investments include Addepar, Affirm, Airbnb, Bird, Clutter, Eventbrite, Facebook, Gusto, Houzz, Intercom, Mixpanel, Opendoor, Palantir Technologies, PayPal, Postmates, ResearchGate, Scribd, Slack, SpaceX, SurveyMonkey, ThirdLove, Uber and Wish.

Craft Ventures 
In late 2017, Sacks co-founded Craft Ventures and raised an initial fund of $350 million. Craft raised $1.1B in 2021, which brought total assets under management to $2B, according to a Medium post published by the company. Unicorns in Craft Ventures Fund I and Fund II include Bird, BitGo, ClickUp, Pipe, Reddit, SourceGraph and SpaceX.

Political views

The Diversity Myth
In college, Sacks was the co-author – with Peter Thiel – of the 1995 book The Diversity Myth: Multiculturalism and the Politics of Intolerance at Stanford, published by the Independent Institute. The book is critical of political correctness in higher education and argues that more intellectual diversity is needed on college campuses. In 2016, Sacks apologized for parts of the book including where he called date rape, 'belated regret' and questioned, 'Why is all blame placed on the man?.'. According to Max Chafkin, “Sacks included a graphic description of the encounter, noting that the 17-year-old victim ‘still had the physical coordination to perform oral sex,’ and ‘presumably could have uttered the word, ‘no.’”

Support for political campaigns
According to the Federal Election Commission, Sacks donated $50,000 to Republican Party candidate Mitt Romney's presidential campaign in 2012. In 2016, he donated nearly $70,000 to Democratic Party candidate Hillary Clinton's presidential campaign.

In the 2022 San Francisco Board of Education recall elections of members Collins, Moliga, and Lopez, Sacks gave one of the largest contributions to support the recall. He is also a significant booster of Republican candidates, sponsoring a spring 2022 fundraiser for GOP senate hopefuls including J. D. Vance and Blake Masters alongside his former colleague and partner Keith Rabois.

Awards and recognition
San Francisco Business Times 40 Under 40, David Sacks (2012)
Workforce Management Game Changers Award, David Sacks (2011)
San Francisco Business Times Bay Area's Most Admired CEOs (2011)

Personal life
On 7 July 2007, Sacks married Jacqueline Tortorice. The couple have two daughters and one son.

References

External links

Interviews

PayPal people
Living people
Film producers from Tennessee
20th-century American Jews
People from Memphis, Tennessee
People from Tennessee
Stanford University alumni
University of Chicago Law School alumni
American chief executives
1972 births
American chief operating officers
South African Jews
South African emigrants to the United States
21st-century American Jews